The 1836 Vermont gubernatorial election was held on September 6, 1836.

Incumbent Whig acting Governor Silas H. Jennison defeated Democratic nominee William Czar Bradley with 55.89% of the vote.

General election

Candidates
William Czar Bradley, Democratic, former U.S. Representative, Democratic candidate for Governor in 1834 and 1835

Silas H. Jennison, Whig (with Anti-Masonic support), incumbent acting Governor

Results

Notes

References

1836
Vermont
Gubernatorial